Great Sandy National Park is a coastal national park in the Fraser Coast Region, Queensland, Australia.

Geography
The park features untouched beaches, large sand dunes, heathlands, rainforests, swamps, creeks, freshwater lakes and mangrove forests.

Great Sandy National Park is divided into two sections. The Fraser Island (also known as K'Gari and Gari) section encompasses almost all of the world's largest sand island, which is situated north of Rainbow Beach, covering .

Environment

Birds 
The land within the park is classified by BirdLife International as the Cooloola and Fraser Coast Important Bird Area because it supports a large population of black-breasted buttonquails as well as many bush and beach stone-curlews, green catbirds, regent bowerbirds, mangrove honeyeaters, and pale-yellow robins. Cooloola is also home to the eastern ground parrot and has one of the last coastal populations of the emu.

Features 

The Cooloola section contains the Cooloola Great Walk, a five-day hiking trail. Boat tours and canoeing along the Noosa River are popular visitor activities. On Fraser Island is the 90 km long Fraser Island Great Walk.
Lake Cootharaba offers fishing, sailing, and canoeing opportunities.

Whale watching, fishing, four-wheel driving, and bushwalking are also popular. The park also features two shipwrecks; the SS Maheno and the Cherry Venture.

The only place in the world where tall rainforest grows in sand is on Fraser Islsand. The sand island has coloured sand cliffs on its eastern beach and numerous walking tracks from short boardwalks to longer walks, which cross sand blows.

Fraser Island also has more than 100 freshwater lakes including the largest perched lake in the world, Lake Boomanjin. Lake Wabby is a popular swimming and fishing spot.

A unique feature of Great Sandy National Park is the coloured sands, which are formed by old sand mixed with clay into a consolidated mass. The visible hues include red, brown, and yellow, which are a reflection of the iron-rich minerals embedded in the sands for thousands of years and brought to the surface by wind and water eroding the land.

Access 
Access to Fraser Island ideally requires a high-clearance 4WD vehicle. Parts of the Cooloola section are also inaccessible without a four-wheel drive. Vehicles entering the park need to obtain a vehicle permit for both Fraser Island and the Cooloola Recreational Area. Both sections have numerous camping areas.

Camping 
Permits are required to camp in the park.   About 15 camp sites are in the Cooloola section.  Only electric motors and non-motorised vessels are permitted past Campsite 3.

Fines 
Fines are issued for feeding Fraser Island's wild dingo population or leaving food or rubbish that may attract them.

See also 

 Great Sandy Biosphere Reserve
 Protected areas of Queensland
 Clifford Harry Thompson, geomorphologist, influential Cooloola soils researcher
 List of tramways in Queensland

References

External links 
  for K'gari (Fraser Island) section
  for Cooloola Recreation Area section

National parks of Queensland
Protected areas established in 1971
Important Bird Areas of Queensland
Wide Bay–Burnett
Fraser Island
Fraser Coast Region
1971 establishments in Australia